Feldkirchen-Westerham is a municipality in the district of Rosenheim, in Bavaria, Germany. It is situated 22 km west of Rosenheim.

Administrative divisions 
Administratively, the municipality of Feldkirchen-Westerham has 54 named populated places within its jurisdiction:

References

Rosenheim (district)